Nurbagand Nurbagandov (born March 19, 1957, Urakhi, Dakhadayevsky District) is a Russian political figure and a deputy of the 8th State Duma. 

From 1990 to 2008, Nurbagandov  held the positions of the chief state tax inspector, head of the department of taxation of individuals, head of the department in the state tax inspectorate for the Sergokalinsky District of Dagestan. In 2008-2015, he headed the branch of the Russian Agricultural Bank. Since September 2021, he has served as the deputy of the 8th State Duma.

He is the father of the Hero of the Russian Federation, Magomed Nurbagandov, who was killed by the Islamic State militants in 2016.

On 24 March 2022, the United States Treasury sanctioned him in response to the 2022 Russian invasion of Ukraine.

References

1957 births
Living people
People from Dagestan
Dargwa people
United Russia politicians
21st-century Russian politicians
Eighth convocation members of the State Duma (Russian Federation)
Russian individuals subject to the U.S. Department of the Treasury sanctions